Ernest A. Beedle (August 31, 1933 – January 31, 1968) was an American lawyer and politician.

Beedle lived in Saint Paul, Minnesota and graduated from Humboldt Senior High School in Saint Paul, Minnesota. He served in the Minnesota National Guard and in the United United Air Force Reserve. Beedle received a bachelor's degree in history and political science from Hamline University and his law degree from William Mitchell College of Law. He lived in Saint Paul with his wife and family and practiced law in Saint Paul. Beedle served in the Minnesota House of Representatives from 1959 to 1966.

References

1933 births
1968 deaths
Politicians from Saint Paul, Minnesota
Minnesota National Guard personnel
Minnesota lawyers
Hamline University alumni
William Mitchell College of Law alumni
Members of the Minnesota House of Representatives